Mike Roberts (born 14 November 1982) is a former rugby union Wing.

Honours
London Wasps
Guinness Premiership (3): 2002-03, 2003-04, 2004-05
Heineken Cup (1): 2003-04
Anglo-Welsh Cup (1):

References

External links
Connacht profile

1982 births
Living people
Rugby union wings
Wasps RFC players
Glasgow Warriors players
Connacht Rugby players